Pa, pa, PA, P.A. or pA may refer to:

Businesses and organisations

Government and military
 Palestinian National Authority, also called Palestinian Authority, interim governing body of the Gaza Strip and part of the West Bank
 Pakistan Army
 People's Association (Singapore), a Singaporean grassroots statutory board
 Philippine Army
 Patrulla Águila
 Planning Authority, a government agency of Malta

Airlines
 Pan American World Airways, IATA airline designator PA (to 1991)
 Florida Coastal Airlines, IATA airline designator PA (1995–2010)
 Airblue, IATA airline designator PA (from 2003)

Other
 Progressive Alliance, a political international of social-democratic, socialist and progressive political parties and organisations
 Professional association, a type of business organization
 PA Consulting Group
 PA Media, a news agency in the UK and Ireland, formerly the Press Association
 Produttori Associati, an Italian record label

Linguistics 
 Pa (cuneiform), a cuneiform sign
 Pa (Javanese) (ꦥ), a letter in the Javanese script
 Punjabi language (ISO 639-1 language code pa)
 Abbreviation for several languages, including:
 Proto-Afro-Asiatic
 Proto-Algic
 Proto-Algonquian
 Proto-Altaic
 Proto-Athabaskan
 Proto-Austronesian

Places
 Panama (ISO country code PA)
 Pará, Brazil (ISO 3166-2:BR)
 Pâ, a town in Burkina Faso
 Pennsylvania, US (postal abbreviation PA)
 PA postcode area, Scotland
 Prince Albert, Saskatchewan, Canada

Job titles
 Parliamentary assistant (UK politics)
 Personal assistant
 Physician assistant or physician associate 
 Production assistant, a title in the film industry
 Project architect 
 Prosecuting attorney, title of prosecutors in some US state courts and smaller jurisdictions
 Protonotary Apostolic, the highest ranking non-episcopal honorific title for Roman Catholic clergy
 Public Accountant, a professional qualification in the US

Science and technology
 .pa, top-level domain for Panama
 ALCO PA, a railroad locomotive
 Parental alienation, in psychology
 Pascal (unit), the SI unit of pressure
 Peano axioms, a set of axioms for the natural numbers
 Peptide amphiphile, a type of self-assembling peptide
 Picoamp (pA), one trillionth of an ampere
 Polyacrylamide, a gel-forming polymer
 Polyamide, a family of synthetic materials used in fabrics
 Predictive analytics, analyzes current and historical facts to make predictions about future or otherwise unknown events
 Protactinium, symbol Pa, a chemical element
 Provider-aggregatable address space, a system of allocation of internet addresses
 Public address system (PA system or simply PA), for making public announcements
 Pernicious anemia, anemia that results from lack of intrinsic factor
 Primary aldosteronism, excess production of the hormone aldosterone from the adrenal glands

Private schools
 Phillips Academy Andover, a private secondary school in Massachusetts, United States, often referred to as Phillips Andover or PA
 Portsmouth Abbey School, a private secondary school in Rhode Island, United States
 Pulaski Academy, a private school in Little Rock, Arkansas, United States

People
 Pa, an affectionate term for father
 Pa (name), a list of people with the given name, nickname or surname
 Pa Drengen Changchop Simpa, a mythical ancestor of the Tibetan people

Other uses 
 PA, a series of paper sizes
 Pā, a type of fortified Māori village
 P.A. (group), a southern hip hop trio in Atlanta, Georgia, United States
 Penny Arcade, a video game webcomic
 Performance appraisal, for evaluating an employee's job performance 
 Plate appearance, a statistic in baseball
 Prince Albert (genital piercing), a form of male genital piercing
 Public bill, also known as a Public Act, in law
 Planetary Annihilation, video game, or its successor Planetary Annihilation: Titans

See also 
 P&A (disambiguation)